Susan C. Aldridge is an American academic administrator. She is president of Drexel University Online. Aldridge previously served as president of University of Maryland University College. She was the vice chancellor of the global campus at Troy University and a professor of management, organizational behavior, and policy analysis at National University of Singapore.

Education
Aldridge studied at the Colorado Women's College, completing a BA in sociology and psychology in 1977, and then at the University of Colorado Denver, where she obtained a master's degree and then a doctorate in public administration, graduating in 1991. During this period she worked for the Denver Regional Council of Governments, initially as a planner and then as a division director.

Career
From 1991 to 1994, Aldridge was a professor of management, organizational behavior, and policy analysis at the National University of Singapore where she researched health and aging policy. In 1995, she was appointed director of the Western Region at Troy University and promoted to vice chancellor of the global campus in 2001. In this position, she served as the chief executive for the eCampus' degree programs 14 countries and 17 states.

Aldridge was appointed president of University of Maryland University College in 2006. Under her leadership, the university grew to serve 94,000 students, becoming the largest public university in the country, doubling its annual revenue from $200 million to $400 million. After leaving UMUC in 2012, she assumed the position of senior fellow at the American Association of State Colleges and Universities, where she co-authored a book, Wired for Success, with Kathleen Harvatt.
  
In 2013, Aldridge joined Drexel University as senior vice president for online learning and president of Drexel University Online. She spearheaded a three-year research project around innovations in technology-enhanced education that resulted in Virtually Inspired, an open source website that showcases innovative technologies, promising practices, and trailblazing research in virtual education. This website won two awards, the 2019 Innovation Award from the United States Distance Learning Association and the 2018 Campus Technology Impact Award in the Education Futurists category.

Professional affiliations and recognition
Over the years, Aldridge has advised university presidents and foreign ministries of education, while taking a leading role in numerous higher education panels and various academic conferences across the country and around the world, including a special delegation to Chile and Brazil led by former U.S. Secretary of Education Margaret Spellings. She served as both chair and co-chair of the US-China Forum on Distance Education, as well as co-chair of the Department of Defense Task Force on Distance Learning Standards. Aldridge was an elected board member of the International Academy of Business Disciplines, and a member of the NASULGC-Sloan National Commission on Online Learning. In 2008, she was appointed by the U.S. Secretary of Defense to the Air University Board of Visitors, and later in 2015, to the Marine Corps University Board of Visitors.  
 
Aldridge was recognized by both the State of Colorado and the U.S. Department of Health and Human Services (HHS) for “outstanding leadership” in the field of health care planning and management. Additionally, her contributions in the areas of program planning and evaluation and quality assurance earned her both a Distinguished Service Award from HHS and an Outstanding Public Service Award from the U.S. Social Security Administration.

In 2010, Aldridge received the Women in Technology Global Impact Award for her many achievements in distance education. The Daily Record named her among Maryland’s Top 100 Women in 2008. and the Most Influential Marylanders in 2009, and The Washingtonian recognized her as one of Washington’s 100 Most Powerful Women in both 2009 and 2011. In 2013, she was honored by the US Distance Learning Association with its Hall of Fame Award for Leadership in Distance Learning.

References

External links

Living people
1953 births
Academic staff of the National University of Singapore
University of Colorado Denver alumni
Presidents of the University of Maryland Global Campus
Women heads of universities and colleges
Troy University